Ida Frances Hunt Udall (March 8, 1858 – April 26, 1915) was an American diarist, homesteader, and teacher in territorial Utah and Arizona. A lifelong member of the Church of Jesus Christ of Latter-day Saints (LDS Church), Udall participated in the church's historical practice of plural marriage as the second wife of David King Udall and co-wife of Ella Stewart Udall and Mary Ann Linton Morgan Udall. 

During the height of the United States' prosecutorial campaign against polygamy in the 1880s, Udall went into hiding as a fugitive on the "Mormon Underground". From 1882 to 1886, she authored a diary of her life in plural marriage and then on the Underground. This diary, considered a "major contribution to Mormon pioneer literature" by one biographer, later became the core of a posthumous biography that won the Mormon History Association's Best Biography Award. 

Called a "serene intellectual" by historian Leonard J. Arrington, Udall spent much of her adulthood homesteading in eastern Arizona while she raised six children, several of whom went on to have influential political careers.

Early life

Childhood 

Ida Frances Hunt was born in a covered wagon at Hamilton Fort, Utah, on March 8, 1858. She was the oldest child of John Hunt and Lois B. Pratt Hunt, who were both Mormons, or members of the Church of Jesus Christ of Latter-day Saints (LDS Church), and raised Ida Hunt in their faith. John and Lois Hunt raised Ida in Iron County, Utah, until she was approximately a year old, at which time they moved to San Bernardino, California, where two of her sisters were born. In 1863, Hunt's parents moved the family to Beaver, Utah, where Hunt's maternal grandmother Louisa Barnes Pratt lived, arriving there in May. In November 1869, when she was eleven years old, Hunt was baptized into the LDS Church by immersion in the Beaver River.

Adolescence 
Hunt received her education while growing up in Beaver, and she formed friendships that endured throughout her life. When Hunt was thirteen, her father paid for her and her sisters to attend a local school, and Hunt attended until she was sixteen. 

By the time she was fourteen, Hunt was working as a bookkeeper for a local wool mill. In 1875, Hunt joined the newly formed Beaver Literary Association, and in April of that year she started her own school for children. Seventeen years old, she taught classes and managed all her own finances. In November 1875, John Hunt moved the family from Beaver to Sevier County, Utah, and Hunt continued her teaching career there. She taught for at least a term at a log cabin school in Joseph City, Utah, and for another term at Monroe, Utah.

Young adulthood

New Mexico 
In February 1877, John Hunt moved the family again, this time to New Mexico. On the way, the Hunt family passed through Washington and St. George, Utah. While in St. George in late-February, Ida Hunt and her sister May received their endowments in the St. George Temple.

The family traveled for approximately three months. Hunt and May together drove one of the teams throughout the trip. The Hunts arrived in San Lorenzo, Valencia County, New Mexico, on May 10, 1877, and they stopped there for three weeks before pressing on to the Savoia Valley, an interethnic community where Euro-American Latter-day Saints, Mexicans, Navajo, and Zuni lived in proximity to each other. While living in Savoia, Hunt studied Spanish, taught her younger siblings in an ad hoc school, and made money as a seamstress.

Utah 
In late 1878, the LDS Church called John Hunt to serve as a bishop for the church in Snowflake, Arizona, and he moved the family once again. This time, Ida Hunt did not accompany the rest of her family; she instead moved to Beaver, Utah, arriving there in November 1878, to live with her grandmother Louisa Barnes Pratt. At this time, the Beaver Stake of the LDS Church called Ida Hunt to serve in its Young Ladies Mutual Improvement Association (YLMIA) as a counselor in the presidency. Hunt supported herself by earning money sewing and transcribing court records, and she participated in a vibrant social life with concerts, parties, and sociables. Hunt also reconnected with Johnny Murdock, a son of Beaver Stake president John R. Murdock, and Johnny Murdock became what Genevieve Long calls a "serious suitor" to her.

Arizona 
In the spring of 1880, at her immediate family's urging, Hunt moved to Snowflake, Arizona, to rejoin them. John R. Murdock arranged for Hunt to make the trip with Jesse N. Smith, president of the Eastern Arizona Stake headquartered in Snowflake, and his wives Emma and Augusta. As Hunt traveled with the Smiths, she perceived a "distinct spiritual quality" in their relationship and was so impressed that the experience became a "conversion to polygamy" for her.

Hunt reunited with her family in Snowflake. Shortly after their arrival, Smith called Hunt to serve as YLMIA president for the Eastern Arizona Stake; she simultaneously served as secretary of the stake-level Relief Society. In her professional life, Hunt returned to teaching, and she taught at log schools in Snowflake and Taylor, Arizona.

In 1881, Johnny Murdock proposed marriage to Hunt, but she broke off their relationship. Hunt wanted a polygamous marriage involving other wives, and Murdock was a monogamist who did not support polygamy. Hunt regarded polygamy as a spiritual calling and may have believed it was a mission for her to undertake to make sacrifices for her faith.

Plural courtship and engagement 
While Hunt was in Snowflake, she met David King Udall, a Latter-day Saint who at the time was bishop in St. Johns, Arizona, and superintendent of a church-endorsed Co-op store. In need of a clerk for the Co-op, Udall wanted to hire someone who spoke Spanish, and he found Hunt an agreeable candidate. Udall hired Hunt in the autumn of 1881, and she moved to St. Johns to work for the Co-op, boarding with Udall, his wife Eliza Luella "Ella" Stewart Udall, and their baby daughter Pearl (b. 1880). Hunt and David had a mutual attraction, and that winter, with Ella's consent, David asked Hunt about the possibility of her marrying him as a plural wife.

Sensitive to the feelings of Ella, whom she deeply respected, Hunt moved back to Snowflake and returned to teaching at a school in Taylor. From there, Hunt asked Ella Udall by a January 1882 letter for permission to plurally marry her husband. Replying by mail in March, Ella Udall, albeit somewhat reluctantly, consented to Hunt marrying David Udall. David, Ella, and Pearl Udall met up with Hunt in Snowflake, and on May 6, 1882, the four of them departed together, heading for St. George, Utah, to marry in the temple there.

Early marriage 
Hunt began keeping a diary the day she and the Udalls departed for their wedding. The diary was simultaneously a personal journal and a conscious contribution to recording the history of the Latter-day Saint people. In her writing, Hunt made "artful use of language and plot", as literary scholar Genevieve Long describes, and she drew upon tropes from contemporary sentimental fiction to articulate the narrative of her experiences.Hunt and the Udalls journeyed by way of the "Honeymoon Trail" leading from Snowflake to St. George. On the way, Hunt conducted herself cautiously, hoping to avoid offending Ella Udall who remained ambivalent about the plural marriage. To portray this in her diary, Hunt used romantic tropes that dramatized the difficult emotions she felt around David and Ella. After a three-week trip, they arrived in St. George, and Ida Hunt married David Udall with Ella present in the St. George Temple on May 25, 1882.

Following the marriage, Ida Udall and Ella Udall made some rapprochement. They spent the wedding night together, and on the way back to St. Johns they continued having private conversations with each other. The Udall family also made a two-week stop to visit with Ella's relatives, and Ida Udall "integrat[ed] into the[ir] world of polygamous wives" and extended family, achieving some measure of reconciliation "between wife and wife".

Udall stayed with her father over the summer. On August 25, 1882, she moved back to St. Johns and into the same household as David, Ella, and Pearl. While living together, Udall and Ella collaborated on community projects, such as a local May Day celebration in 1884.

Community life in St. Johns was uneasy. The Latter-day Saints were relative newcomers to the town, and more established Catholic Mexican residents resented the Mormons' presence. Udall felt uncomfortable surrounded by this animosity. Worsening matters, in an attitude common among white Mormons at the time, Udall evinced racism against Mexicans, whom she did not consider neighbors.

Mormon Underground 
In mid-1884, David Udall was indicted on a charge of polygamy. To avoid being subpoenaed and forced to testify against him, as questioning plural wives in court was a well-known strategy of anti-polygamy prosecution, Ida Udall went into hiding for over two years in a practice known as the "Mormon Underground". Historian Charles Peterson writes that Udall did so to "remove the physical evidence that would indict" David: herself. Accompanied by three other plural wives, Udall vacated St. Johns and went to Snowflake. 

In August, federal marshals inquired after Ida Udall at the Udall home in St. Johns; they even questioned four-year-old Pearl, who denied any knowledge of Ida Udall's whereabouts. By September 28, Udall was leaving Arizona in order to live with David Udall's parents in Nephi, Utah. When prosecutors brought polygamy charges against David Udall, they were unable to summon Ida Udall to testify against him and failed to secure a conviction.

Udall remained on the Underground for over two years and gave birth to her first child with David, named Pauline, while in hiding. During this time, Udall stayed with David's parents sporadically, and she depended heavily on support from a network of friends and other Latter-day Saint women who assisted her materially and emotionally by helping her secure employment, childcare, social connections, and emotional stability. To support herself, Udall often turned to sewing and bookkeeping, and she briefly held a job transcribing county records. In order to obfuscate their relationship and her location, Udall communicated with David only through her co-wife Ella. Even in this correspondence, David wrote as if he and Ida were siblings in order to maintain a "family cover", though not being acknowledged as a wife frustrated Udall, who felt lonely in her isolation from the family.

Although prosecutors did not successfully bring polygamy charges against David Udall, in 1885 he was convicted and imprisoned on a perjury charge that was attributed to anti-polygamy lobbying in St. Johns. However, Grover Cleveland pardoned David for the perjury, and the polygamy charge was dropped in 1886. Ida Udall eventually returned to eastern Arizona from Utah. That same year, in November, she stopped keeping a diary.

Udall and her daughter did not immediately return to St. Johns; they stayed with her parents in Snowflake until March 1888, when she moved to a farm in Round Valley, Arizona, that David and his brother had purchased. Ella Udall and her children visited that summer; it was the first time Udall and Ella had seen each other in four years. 

Ella's ambivalence about plural marriage persisted, however. When David had financial difficulty in caring for the whole family, he temporarily had Ida move back in with her parents in Snowflake, for fear of "offend[ing] Ella", and Udall's place in the household remained inconstant thereafter. For two years, Udall and her children moved back and forth between Snowflake and Round Valley, and Ella and her children moved back and forth between Round Valley and St. Johns. Anti-polygamy prosecution also continued to haunt Udall; in the summer of 1891, she and friend Mary Linton Morgan cut short a stay in Round Valley and fled to Snowflake to hide from federal marshals.

Homesteading and later life 
In 1890, LDS Church president Wilford Woodruff issued a manifesto which publicly advised Latter-day Saints to obey federal laws outlawing polygamy, withdrawing the church's official sanction of the practice. The Udalls lived as one family in a single household in the winter of 1891–1892, but in the spring David concluded that complying with the Woodruff Manifesto required not cohabitating with plural wives, and he moved Ida Udall to a farm in Eagar, Arizona, where she ran a co-op store while he occasionally checked in. However, in July 1892, church leaders instructed him otherwise and to remain a family, and David restored contact with Ida Udall. Still, for most of the remainder of her life, Udall lived separately from David and Ella.

At the turn of the century, Udall applied for a homestead in her own name and obtained property in Greer Valley (later called Hunt Valley), Arizona, where she began living in the spring of 1902. The homestead was named Hunt. Udall and her sons worked the property, starting in a tent and eventually building a house. Over the years, she tended a garden, raised grain, kept pigs, cows, and chickens; made cheese, butter, and hay; and managed the property as a way station for mail carriers. Udall also continued using her business and bookkeeping skills. She handled finances for the Hunt ranch and wrote David's professional and ecclesiastical correspondence on his behalf. Throughout these conditions, Udall was a "serene intellectual", in the words of historian Leonard J. Arrington, who promoted culture and education. 

Udall had six children with David, and for the most part she raised them on her own while David mostly lived with Ella. In May 1903, Latter-day Saint apostles Matthias F. Cowley and John W. Taylor encouraged David Udall to plurally marry Mary Ann Linton Morgan, a widow whose husband John Morgan had died in 1894. Ida Udall, a close friend of Morgan's, "was willing and anxious" for the marriage. At Cowley and Taylor's behest, David quietly married Morgan, and she and her three young sons began living with Ida Udall and her children at Hunt a little before Christmas that year. Having been friends for years, Udall and Morgan "ma[de] for [a] particularly amicable household" when they became co-wives. 

From 1906 to 1908, Udall suffered three strokes, the last of which paralyzed her on her left side. Pauline took responsibility for Udall's care, and Pearl, at the time a student at the Los Angeles College of Osteopathy, took a leave from her program in order to help. Thereafter, Udall and Pauline lived variously in Hunt Valley, St. Johns, and Snowflake. In what biographer Ellsworth calls an "unexpected blessing", Ella Udall's sometimes fraught feelings toward her co-wife warmed, and her relationship with Ida Udall improved.

Seven years after her third stroke, Udall died in Hunt Valley on April 26, 1915, in the home and company of her daughter Pauline. Udall was buried in St. Johns.

Legacy

Family 
Many of Udall's children became prominent figures in Western community and politics. Three of her sons—John Hunt Udall, Jesse Addison Udall, and Don Taylor Udall—served in the Arizona state legislature. John Hunt Udall was a two-time gubernatorial nominee and later a mayor of Phoenix, Arizona. John's son, John Nicholas Udall, was later a mayor of Phoenix as well; he served several terms. Don Taylor and Jesse Addison were also superior court judges in Navajo County and Graham County, respectively. In 1960, Jesse acceded to the Arizona state supreme court, and he served as a justice for eleven years. Pearl Udall moved to Salt Lake City, Utah, and opened a medical practice, which she successfully ran the rest of her life. Pauline remained in northeastern Arizona; she served for seventeen years as president of the LDS Church's Snowflake Stake Primary Association.

Udall is also the great-grandmother of Milan Smith, a judge on the United States Court of Appeals for the Ninth Circuit. She is the great-great-grandmother of novelist Brady Udall, author of The Lonely Polygamist.

Diary 
The diary Udall kept during the first four years of her marriage is, according to biographer Maria S. Ellsworth, a "major contribution to Mormon pioneer literature." In a historical and literary analysis, Genevieve J. Long concludes that Udall's journal is "an important account of polygamous life" and "may justly be called an autobiography, a carefully crafted, artful reconstruction of a life". Written as both a "personal resource" and "public record", the diary demonstrates creativity, literary strategy, and intertextuality with then-contemporary literature. As a historical document, Charles S. Peterson describes Udall's writing as being "Outstanding among" Mormon women's diaries, "written with feeling and perception". Peggy Pascoe considers it "riveting reading".

Udall's diary is the core of a biography assembled by Ellsworth which the University of Illinois Press published in 1992. Titled Mormon Odyssey: The Story of Ida Hunt Udall, Plural Wife, the book contains full transcriptions of Udall's diary and unfinished memoir alongside biographical writing by Ellsworth. After its publication, Mormon Odyssey received the Mormon History Association's Ella Larsen Turner Best Biography Award.

See also 

 Autobiography
 Mormon literature
 Northern Arizona
 The Church of Jesus Christ of Latter-day Saints in Arizona
 Udall family

References

Notes

General sources 
  An annotated compilation of Udall's writings, including her diary, bookended by editorial biographical content written by Ellsworth.

Further reading 
 
  2nd ed. (2010). Salt Lake City: Greg Kofford Books. .

External links 
 David King and Ida F. Hunt Udall family papers, held at the Utah State University Merrill-Cazier Library
 Ida Hunt Udall photograph collection, held at the Utah State University Merrill-Cazier Library
 The Church of Jesus Christ of Latter-day Saints' official historical topic webpage on Ida Hunt Udall, a supplement to Saints, its multivolume official history
 Ida Hunt's first appearance in Saints, volume 2, No Unhallowed Hand, 1846–1893

1858 births
1915 deaths
19th-century American women writers
19th-century diarists
American diarists
American Latter Day Saint writers
Arizona pioneers
History of the Church of Jesus Christ of Latter-day Saints
Latter Day Saints from Arizona
Mormonism and polygamy
People from Beaver, Utah
People from St. Johns, Arizona
People from San Bernardino, California
Polygamy in the United States
The Church of Jesus Christ of Latter-day Saints members
Udall family
Women in Arizona
Young Women (organization) people